Willeke is a Dutch feminine given name and also a surname. The given name may be abbreviated as Wil. People with that name include:

 Willeke Alberti (born 1945), Dutch singer and actress
 Willeke Knol (born 1991), Dutch racing cyclist
 Willeke van Ammelrooy (born 1944), Dutch actress and director
 Willeke van der Weide (born 1965), Dutch road racing cyclist
 Willeke Wendrich (born 1961), Dutch-American Egyptologist and archaeologist.
 Leonard B. Willeke (active 1911-1918), American architect

See also
 Wilhelmina (given name), a related Dutch feminine name
 Willem, a related Dutch masculine given name
 Wilma (given name), a related name
 

Dutch feminine given names